Erebus atavistis is a moth of the family Erebidae. It is found in the Republic of Congo, Gabon, South Africa, Tanzania, Uganda and Zimbabwe.

References

Moths described in 1913
Erebus (moth)